Imara may refer to:

People
 Imara Esteves Ribalta (born 1978), Cuban beach volleyball player
 Imara Reis (born 1948), Brazilian stage, television and film actress
 Nia Imara, American astrophysicist and artist

Other uses
 Imara, Estonia, village in Estonia
 Imara (moth), a genus of moths within the family Castniidae
 Argentine Marines, abbreviated as IMARA

See also
 Al-Imara, Palestinian village